Finnshalspiggen is a mountain in Lom Municipality in Innlandet county, Norway. The mountain is surrounded by several other notable mountains including Lauvhøe to the northwest, Eisteinhovde to the north, Kvitingskjølen to the northeast, and Nørdre Trollsteinhøe and Gråhøe to the south.

See also
List of mountains of Norway

References

Lom, Norway
Mountains of Innlandet